Anders Sømme Hammer (born 20 August 1977) is a Norwegian documentarian and journalist.

He moved to Kabul, Afghanistan in June 2007 to cover the ongoing war. He was a freelancer, but produced for several media outlets. He delivered news and radio and television documentaries for NRK and TV 2, and wrote for national outlets such as Dagbladet, Dagsavisen, Dagens Næringsliv, Morgenbladet, the Norwegian News Agency and Samtiden. In 2010 he released the book Drømmekrigen ("The Dream War") on Aschehoug.

He was named Freelancer of the Year by the Norwegian Union of Journalists in 2010 and received the Fritt Ord Award in 2011.

His 2019 documentary Do Not Split was awarded the Short Film Special Jury Prize at the AFI Docs 2020 festival.  It later got nominated for the Academy Award for Best Documentary Short Subject at the 93rd Academy Awards.

References

1977 births
Living people
Norwegian newspaper journalists
Norwegian television journalists
Norwegian newspaper reporters and correspondents
Norwegian documentary filmmakers
Norwegian expatriates in Afghanistan